This is a list of Cypriot football transfers for the 2014–15 winter transfer window by club. Only transfers of clubs in the Cypriot First Division and Cypriot Second Division are included.

The winter transfer window opened on 1 January 2015, although a few transfers took place prior to that date. The window closed at midnight on 2 February 2015. Players without a club may join one at any time, either during or in between transfer windows.

Cypriot First Division

AEK Larnaca

In:

Out:

AEL Limassol

In:

Out:

Anorthosis Famagusta

In:

Out:

APOEL

In:

Out:

Apollon Limassol

In:

Out:

Ayia Napa

In:

Out:

Doxa Katokopias

In:

Out:

Ermis Aradippou

In:

Out:

Ethnikos Achna

In:

Out:

Nea Salamina

In:

Out:

Omonia

In:

Out:

Othellos Athienou

In:

Out:

Cypriot Second Division

AEZ Zakakiou

In:

Out:

Anagennisi Dherynia

In:

Out:

APEP Pitsilia

In:

Out:

Aris Limassol

In:

Out:

Digenis Voroklinis

In:

Out:

Elpida Xylofagou

In:

Out:

ENAD Polis Chrysochous

In:

Out:

Enosis Neon Paralimni

In:

Out:

Enosis Neon Parekklisia

In:

Out:

Karmiotissa Polemidion

In:

Out:

Nikos & Sokratis Erimis

In:

Out:

Olympiakos Nicosia

In:

Out:

Omonia Aradippou

In:

Out:

Pafos FC

In:

Out:

References

Cyprus
Transfers
2014 winter